Josh Drack (born September 22, 1999) is an American soccer player who currently plays as a full back for Huntsville City in the MLS Next Pro.

Career

Youth
Drack was part of the Arizona Arsenal Soccer Club and Real Salt Lake academy in Arizona, before moving to the Portland Timbers academy in 2016. In addition, he was with the Chilean clubs Colo-Colo and Universidad Católica in a brief trial step at the age of 14.

College & Amateur
In 2017, Drack went to play college soccer at Grand Canyon University. In two years with the Antelopes, Drack made 39 appearances, scoring 6 goals and tallying 7 assists. Following his Freshman season, Drack was named WAC Freshman of the Year, was named to the conference's All-Freshman team and All-Conference honorable mention. In 2019, Drack transferred to the University of Denver where he played a single season, scoring 5 goals and tallying 3 assists for the Pioneers. He was named  Summit League Second Team and to the Summit League All-Newcomer Team. There was no Senior season at Denver due to the COVID-19 pandemic.

Drack also appeared for USL League Two side Colorado Pride Switchbacks U23 during their 2019 season.

Professional
On January 21, 2021, Drack was selected 16th overall in the 2021 MLS SuperDraft by LA Galaxy. On April 26, 2021, Drack signed with USL Championship side LA Galaxy II.

Drack made his professional debut on April 30, 2021, starting in a 1–0 loss to Sacramento Republic.

On July 7, 2021, Drack was added to LA Galaxy's MLS roster on a short-term deal. The same day he appeared for the team as an injury-time substitute during a 3–1 win over FC Dallas.

On February 6, 2023, Drack was announced as a new signing for MLS Next Pro side Huntsville City FC.

Personal life
Josh was born to a Chilean father and a Japanese mother. They are Rick (or Ricardo) Drack and Masayo Drack (née Asami). His brothers are Jon, Betty and Jacob.

Due to his descent, he is elegible to play for United States, Chile or Japan.

References

External links
 
 

1999 births
Living people
Sportspeople from Chandler, Arizona
Soccer players from Arizona
American people of Chilean descent
Sportspeople of Chilean descent
American people of Japanese descent
American sportspeople of Japanese descent
Association football defenders
American soccer players
Grand Canyon Antelopes men's soccer players
Denver Pioneers men's soccer players
LA Galaxy draft picks
LA Galaxy players
LA Galaxy II players
Major League Soccer players
USL Championship players
USL League Two players